Australian Rover Moots are the major national event run by Australian Rovers who are part of Scouts Australia.

History 

A moot is a gathering of Rover Scouts (generally called Rovers). It was named by Robert Baden-Powell, the founder of the Scouting Movement in a letter to Percy Bantock Nevill who was charged with co-ordinating a gathering of Rovers at Royal Albert Hall, London in 1926. The word "Moot" is in fact an Old English word meaning assembly or gathering. The first World Rover Moot was held in 1931 at Kandersteg, Switzerland.

Australian National Rover Moots were subsequently established in 1951, They have since been held every three years, typically lasting from 9 to 11 days each, and are run by each state - on a rotating basis.

List

See also

 World Scout Moot

External links

WAM Moot’s website
CBR Moot's website
AIM Moot's website

Rover Moot, Australian